Randy Winkler is a former offensive tackle in the National Football League. He was drafted in the twelfth round of the 1966 NFL Draft by the Detroit Lions and later played with the team during the 1967 NFL season. The following season, he would play with the Atlanta Falcons. After two years away from the NFL, he played with the Green Bay Packers during the 1971 NFL season.

References

People from Temple, Texas
Detroit Lions players
Atlanta Falcons players
Green Bay Packers players
American football offensive tackles
Tarleton State Texans football players
1943 births
Living people